Abu Talib Yahya (951 - 1033) was an imam of the Zaydiyyah sect in 1020–1033.

Like his elder brother and predecessor al-Mu'ayyad Ahmad, Abu Talib Yahya was a prominent man of learning and a descendant of Imam Hasan bin Ali. He succeeded al-Mu'ayyad Ahmad in the imamate of the Zaidi territories in Gilan and Deylaman in Persia, formally as "caliph". At this time there were two major Zaidi territories, namely the area south of the Caspian Sea and the highlands of Yemen. For many years after the death of imam al-Mahdi al-Husayn in 1013, no local imam was appointed in the Yemeni territory. In Zaidi historiography, al-Mu'ayyad Ahmad and Abu Talib Yahya are sometimes listed as such, although they never visited Yemen.

See also

 Imams of Yemen

References

Zaydi imams of Yemen
951 births
1033 deaths
11th century in Iran
Hasanids
10th-century Arabs
11th-century Arabs
11th-century caliphs